Łabski Szczyt or Violík (in Polish and Czech) is a mountain peak located in the western Giant Mountains on the Czech-Polish border. The source of the Elbe River, one of Europe's major rivers, is situated on the southern (Czech) slopes of the mountain.

Situation
In the main range the very distinct peak is situated between Szrenica (separated from it by Mokra Pass) and Śnieżne Kotły, the next peak eastwards being Wielki Szyszak. The summit is entirely on the Polish side.

Tourism
The Polish–Czech Friendship Trail crosses the summit. Two mountain huts in the vicinity: Polish Schronisko pod Łabskim Szczytem and Czech Labská bouda – a modern concrete eight floor block, completed in 1975, a representative of brutalist architecture.

References

Mountains of Poland
Mountains and hills of the Czech Republic
Czech Republic–Poland border
International mountains of Europe